Flerden (Romansh: Flearda) is a municipality in the Viamala Region in the Swiss canton of Graubünden.

History
Flerden is first mentioned in 1156 as Flirden.

Geography
Of this area, 54.6% is used for agricultural purposes, while 30% is forested. Of the rest of the land, 3.6% is settled (buildings or roads) and the remainder (11.7%) is non-productive (rivers, glaciers or mountains).

Before 2017, the municipality was located in the Thusis sub-district, of the Hinterrhein district, after 2017 it was part of the Viamala Region.

Demographics
, 2.0% of the population was made up of foreign nationals. Over the last 10 years the population has grown at a rate of 15.3%.

, the gender distribution of the population was 49.5% male and 50.5% female.  The age distribution, in Flerden is; 14 people or 8.8% of the population are between 0 and 9 years old.  22 people or 13.8% are 10 to 14, and 13 people or 8.1% are 15 to 19.  Of the adult population, 9 people or 5.6% of the population are between 20 and 29 years old.  17 people or 10.6% are 30 to 39, 30 people or 18.8% are 40 to 49, and 21 people or 13.1% are 50 to 59.  The senior population distribution is 12 people or 7.5% of the population are between 60 and 69 years old, 16 people or 10.0% are 70 to 79, there are 6 people or 3.8% who are 80 to 89.

In the 2007 federal election the most popular party was the SVP which received 47.6% of the vote.  The next three most popular parties were the FDP (24.4%), the SPS (14%) and the CVP (12.7%).

The entire Swiss population is generally well educated.  In Flerden about 81% of the population (between age 25-64) have completed either non-mandatory upper secondary education or additional higher education (either university or a Fachhochschule).

Flerden has an unemployment rate of 0.32%.  , there were 42 people employed in the primary economic sector and about 16 businesses involved in this sector.  3 people are employed in the secondary sector and there are 2 businesses in this sector.  15 people are employed in the tertiary sector, with 4 businesses in this sector.

The historical population is given in the following table:

Languages
Most of the population speaks German (95.6%), with Romansh being second most common ( 3.8%) and Italian being third ( 0.6%).

References

Municipalities of Graubünden